Sunday Observance Act may refer to 

 The Sunday Observance Act 1625, an Act of the Parliament of England
 The Sunday Observance Act 1627, an Act of the Parliament of England
 The Sunday Observance Act 1677, an Act of the Parliament of England
 The Sunday Observance Act 1695, an Act of the Parliament of Ireland
 The Sunday Observance Act 1780, an Act of the Parliament of Great Britain